Zabir Saeed (born May 22, 1972) is a Pakistani journalist and editor, known for his columns in Urdu and English newspapers. He is also a writer and public relations practitioner. He has written more than Fifty books about the subjects of mass communication and journalism.

Education 

Saeed received his early education from Saint Joseph School in Lahore, and matriculated from government pilot secondary school, one of the best educational institutions of the time. He completed his F. Sc & B. Sc from Islamia College in Lahore, and then earned his master's degree in mass communication from the department of mass communication of the University of the Punjab in 1996 with distinction. He earned an M.A. in history from the same university.

Career 

Saeed was inspired by his father Saeed Badar, who is also a poet, journalist and writer. His grandfather Hakeem Muhammad Yaqub Munir Azeemi Qadri was another source of guidance and inspiration for him. He has written a book on his life and works. He has contributed articles to several newspapers of Pakistan, such as the dailies Jang, Imroze, and the Pakistan Times. He started his journalistic career as sub-editor for the Lahore daily Nawa-e-waqt. Subsequently, he joined Pakistan’s Jang media group in 2002. He also rendered his services as a public relations practitioner to the water and sanitation agency(WASA) and the University of Education in Lahore as well as other public relations organizations.

Achievements 
Zabir Saeed is renowned as media strategist, public relations practitioner, communication educationist, research scholar and a writer of dozen of books in the fields of Journalism, Mass Communication, Public Relations, History and Current Affairs .
He is also known for his articles, columns, features, children stories and won many awards as best feature writer.

He actively participated in various literary activities and he is the president of South Asian Literary Forum (SALF).Now -a-days he is associated with the largest Media group of Pakistan the JANG GROUP. He is also delivering lectures in Institute of Communication Studies, University of the Punjab, and many other leading universities as a senior visiting professor. He has been awarded the best Media Educationist for the year 2015 by (SALF) and Recently Zabir Saeed Badar has been given the Lifetime Achievement Award by Pakistan Writers Guild and Qalam Foundation International

He organized the first Perween Shakir literary award in Pakistan in 1995.
He is a pioneer of publishing community newspapers of Pakistan in Lahore, founding Makhzan-e-Iqbal, which was the first of its kind.
He is a council member of the Lahore Press club and the Pakistan Federal Union of Journalists.

Books and publications 

He has written more than fifty books in the subjects of mass communication, journalism, history, literature, and social psychology.
He has also written about 1,000 articles, features, columns, and editorials.

Partial bibliography
 Ablagh Aama Aur Development Sport Communication
 Ablagh Aama Aur Badalti Dunya
 Zaban Aur Ablagh
 Idarat Aur Us Key Jadeed Rujhanaat
 Khabar Aur Khabriyat
 Pakistan Aur Global World
 Sahafat Say Ablaghiat Tak
 The Voyage of Mass Communication
 Pakistan Aur Global World
 Mass Communication Advanced Studies
 Media Research
 Media History laws And Ethics
 Magazine Journalism
 Language Skills And Communicative Abilities
 Pakistan Aur Foj

References

1972 births
Living people
Pakistani male journalists
Pakistani writers